PS-121 Karachi West-V is a constituency of the Provincial Assembly of Sindh.

General elections 2013

General elections 2008

See also
 PS-120 Karachi West-IV
 PS-122 Karachi West-VI

References

External links
 Election commission Pakistan's official website
 Awazoday.com check result
 Official Website of Government of Sindh

Constituencies of Sindh